Alfred Black (17 November 1856 – 12 December 1912) was a British sports shooter. He competed in the men's trap event at the 1912 Summer Olympics.

References

1856 births
1912 deaths
British male sport shooters
Olympic shooters of Great Britain
Shooters at the 1912 Summer Olympics
Sportspeople from London